Sarman is a small airfield with an asphalt runway in Tatarstan, Russia, located  northwest of Sarman village.

References
RussianAirFields.com

Airports built in the Soviet Union
Airports in Tatarstan